Amshi de Silva (born 11 November 2001) is a Sri Lankan cricketer. He made his List A debut on 27 October 2021, for Colombo Cricket Club in the 2021–22 Major Clubs Limited Over Tournament. Prior to his List A debut, he was named in Sri Lanka's squad for the 2020 Under-19 Cricket World Cup.

In April 2022, Sri Lanka Cricket (SLC) named him in the Sri Lanka Emerging Team's squad for their tour to England. On 25 May 2022, during the tour of England, he made his Twenty20 debut, against Surrey. In June 2022, he was named in the Sri Lanka A squad for their matches against Australia A during Australia's tour of Sri Lanka.

References

External links
 

2001 births
Living people
Sri Lankan cricketers
Colombo Cricket Club cricketers
Cricketers from Galle